The Robert F. Carey Memorial Handicap was an American Thoroughbred horse race run from 1983 through 2013 at Hawthorne Race Course in Stickney/Cicero, Illinois. A former Grade 3 event, it was open to horses age three and older and contested on turf over a distance of one mile (8 furlongs).

Inaugurated on October 9, 1983, the race is named in honor of Robert Francis Carey, founder of the American Brick Company and the Managing Director of Hawthorne from 1947 to his death in 1980.

In  1985, 1994 and again in 2009, soft course conditions from heavy rains resulted in the race being transferred to the main dirt track.

Records
Speed record:
 1:33.40 @ 1 mile: Soviet Line (1998)
 1:47.00 @ 1 1-8 miles: Iron Courage (1989)

Most wins:
 2 – Homing Pigeon (1995, 1996)

Most wins by a trainer:
 3 – Harvey L. Vanier (1989, 1995, 1996)
 3 – Chris M. Block (2003, 2010, 2012)

Most wins by an owner:
 3 – Nancy A. Vanier (1989, 1995, 1996)
 3 – Team Block (2003, 2010, 2012)

Winners

 † Transferred from the turf course to the dirt track.

References

 The 2009 Robert F. Carey Memorial Handicap at Bloodhorse.com

Discontinued horse races
Open mile category horse races
Graded stakes races in the United States
Turf races in the United States
Recurring sporting events established in 1983
Recurring sporting events disestablished in 2014
Hawthorne Race Course